York Meetinghouse is a historic Quaker meeting house at 135 West Philadelphia Street in York, York County, Pennsylvania.  It was built in 1766 and expanded in 1783. The original building was a two-bay brick structure with a gable roof.  The addition nearly doubled the size of the building.  It is a two-bay brick structure with another entrance and window. The meeting house is still used for regular worship.

It was added to the National Register of Historic Places in 1975.

References

External links

York Meeting Website
History of York Friends Meeting

Quaker meeting houses in Pennsylvania
Churches on the National Register of Historic Places in Pennsylvania
Religious buildings and structures completed in 1766
18th-century Quaker meeting houses
Churches in York County, Pennsylvania
Buildings and structures in York, Pennsylvania
National Register of Historic Places in York County, Pennsylvania